Compsoctena cossinella is a moth in the family Eriocottidae. It was described by Francis Walker in 1866. It is found in India.

Adults are whitish, the forewings very thinly brown speckled, except for two broad postmedial longitudinal streaks where the speckles are numerous. The costa has brown subquadrate marks and the exterior border has short brown streaks, which extend over the fringe. The hindwings are pale cinereous (ash grey).

References

Moths described in 1866
Compsoctena
Moths of Asia